Potassium fluoride on alumina (KF/Al2O3) is a chemical reagent consisting of potassium fluoride and aluminium oxide.  It is a base which is used in organic synthesis. It was originally introduced in 1979 by Ando et al. for inducing alkylation reactions.

References

Inorganic compounds
Reagents for organic chemistry